The Instituto de Enseñanza Secundaria Lope de Vega (IES Lope de Vega) is a public high school in Madrid, Spain. It is located in the calle de San Bernardo. It is operated by the regional administration of the Community of Madrid.

History 
The institution was created during the Spanish Second Republic via a decree issued on 26 August 1933. although it was not yet housed at the corner of Calle de San Bernardo with Calle de Daoíz. It was one of the only 3 high schools that remained open in Madrid during the Civil War. The school featured a pro-rebel faculty, constituting a "Nationalist" stronghold in Republican Madrid for the extent of the conflict. It was the only secondary school of those created in the Spanish capital during the second republic which remained undisturbed after the war, as the rest were closed.

The building in San Bernardo (that prior to the installment of the secondary school had housed a Normal school and the Pedagogical Museum) was declared Bien de Interés Cultural on 26 March 1999.

Decorations 

References 
Citations

Bibliography
 
 
 
 

Buildings and structures in Universidad neighborhood, Madrid
Bien de Interés Cultural landmarks in Madrid
Secondary schools in the Community of Madrid
Schools in Madrid